"Love Comes Quickly" is a song by English synth-pop duo Pet Shop Boys, released as the second single from their debut studio album, Please (1986). It peaked at number 19 on the UK Singles Chart in March 1986.

Writing and production
Love Comes Quickly was the first song written by Neil Tennant and Chris Lowe after they first met.

Producer Stephen Hague receives a co-writing credit for writing the first two chords of the middle section of the song. Andy Mackay of Roxy Music plays the saxophone parts towards the end of the song.

Release
As with "Opportunities", the 12-version of the single contains remixes by 1980s producer Shep Pettibone. The remixes of "Love Comes Quickly" and "That's My Impression" reached the top ten on the US Billboard Hot Dance Club Play chart in October 1986. Later, in 2003, new remixes by Blank & Jones were produced for the promotion of the singles collection PopArt.

Cover
The cover, featuring Chris Lowe in a baseball cap emblazoned with "BOY" in block letters, has become an iconic Pet Shop Boys image.  Neil Tennant of the duo later recollected that he had expected the image of the cap to be the group's coming out moment, calling it "incredibly gay".

Music video
Directed by Andy Morahan and Eric Watson, the video to the song is very simple, utilising facial shots of Tennant singing, interposed with blurry montages of the faces of various other people; at points, shots of Lowe, lying on top of a construction of a square grid, are superimposed over these shots. Watson would later call it a "complete disaster".

Track listings

7": Parlophone / R 6116 (UK)
 A. "Love Comes Quickly" – 4:18
 B. "That's My Impression" – 4:45

12": Parlophone / 12 R 6116 (UK)
 A. "Love Comes Quickly" (Dance Mix) – 6:50
 B. "That's My Impression" (Disco Mix) – 5:18
also released on 10" (10 R 6116)

12": EMI America / V-19218 (US)
 A1. "Love Comes Quickly" (Shep Pettibone Mastermix) – 7:34
 A2. "Love Comes Quickly" (Dub Mix) – 6:55
 B1. "Love Comes Quickly" (Dance Mix) – 6:50
 B2. "That's My Impression" (Disco Mix) – 5:18

Charts

Cover versions
As early as 1986, a Japanese-language cover version of the song was recorded by pop singer Hidemi Ishikawa.

References

1986 songs
1986 singles
Music videos directed by Andy Morahan
Music videos directed by Eric Watson (photographer)
Parlophone singles
Pet Shop Boys songs
Song recordings produced by Stephen Hague
Songs written by Chris Lowe
Songs written by Neil Tennant
Songs written by Stephen Hague
Synth-pop ballads